Ayatollah Aqa Syed Ahmed Rizvi or Razavi (1316–1384 in Hijri) (Urdu; آیت اللہ آقا سید احمد رضوی کشمیری) was a Shiite Islamic jurist, religious reformer, and scholar who lived in Srinagar city of Kashmir. Hakim Safdar Hamdani in his book Shian-e-Kashmir has termed him as a Mard-e-Mujahid or an Islamic warrior while others, like Syed Kazimi, has described him as a man who had a hidden and heavenly helping hand behind him.

Early life 

Ayatollah Aqa Syed Ahmed Rizvi Kashmiri was born at Nabidpore-Zadibal area of Srinagar city in Indian Administrated Kashmir, in a revered religious and pious family and was a descendant of Shi'ite eighth Imam Ali al-Rizha, the son of Imam Musa al-Kadhim through one of the great saints and religious propagators Mir Aqa Syed Hussein Rizvi Qommi, who went to Kashmir from Qom, Iran in the year 821 A.H., during the reign of Sultan Sikander who appointed him as mentor of his son Sultan Zain-ul-Abidin locally known as Budshah.

Haaj Aqa Syed Hussain Rizvi (d. 1942), father of Ayatollah Syed Ahmed Rizvi Kashmiri, was a learned and well known preacher of his time who was famous by name of Mir Haji Hussain. He, along with some other members of his family, used to travel to Skardu, Baltistan, Yarkand and adjoining areas on business trips and besides doing business preached Islam. He was famously known in Skardu, Baltistan as Mir or Master. His descendants, who preferred to settle down there, are still remembered and revered as family of Ba’mir.

Haaj Aqa Syed Hassan or Mir Syed Hassan (d. 1928), uncle of Ayatollah Aqa Syed Ahmed Rizvi, was also a well known Islamic scholar, preacher and a spiritual figure who had established a Husseiniyeh or a shrine for commemoration of the Martyrdom of Imam Hussein near his residence in Srinagar. The arranging of gatherings for observing the Martyrdom of Imam Hussein was an ancestral practice prevalent in the family since hundreds of years. The practice prevails even to this time and people gather on the same place to remember the Martyrs of Karbala, which was later-on established by Haaj Aqa Hassan and is famous as Shrine of Haaj Syed Hassan or Mir Hassan. Mir Syed Hassan himself is buried in the said Shrine. The family especially Mir Haaj Syed Hassan Rizvi and Mir Haaj Syed Hussein Rizvi, like their ancestors, had devoted themselves for disseminating the true features and knowledge of the religion of Islam.

Genealogy 
(Ayatollah) Syed Ahmed son of Syed Hussein son of Syed Muhammad son of Syed Baqar son of Syed Rehmatullah son of Syed Mohammad son of Syed Hidayatullah son of Syed Saleh (Haigam) son of Syed Sadeq son of Syed Mehdi son of Syed Haaj son of Syed Qasim son of Mir Syed Mohammad (interred at a Shrine in Ahmedpore, Baramulla, Kahsmir) son of Mir Syed Hussein Qomi (came to Kashmir in 821 AH, interred at Syed Pora Zainagair, Kashmir) son of Syed Muhammad son of Syed Ahmed son of Syed Minhaj son of Syed Jalal son of Syed Qasim son of Syed Ali Rizvi son of Syed Habib son of Syed Hussein son of Abu Abdullah Saiyed Ahmed 'Naqeeb' (of city of Qom) son of Syed Muhammad (Al-Aeraj) son of Abu Muqarem Ahmed son of Aqa Syed Moosa (alias Musa al Mubarraqa) son of Imam Mohammad al-Taqi al-Jawad son of Imam Abul Hassan al-Rizha.

Education 
Ayatollah Syed Ahmed Rizvi got his early education from his family elders especially from his father and after completing his basic education at home left for further studies to Lucknow in India, where he studied under the leading scholars for more than three years. From Lucknow, he went for further studies to the city of Najaf in Iraq, which has remained as the centre of Shitte Islamic seminaries and focus of spiritual subjects for almost fourteen hundred years. In Najaf, he studied in Islamic Seminaries under the prominent scholars and well-known jurists for more than twenty years, attending the lectures of Jurisprudence of Grand Ayatollah Mohammad Hussain Na'ini, Grand Ayatollah Aqa Abul Hassan Isfahani, Grand Ayatollah Syed Hussain Qommi, Grand Ayatollah Aqa Zia-ud-Din Iraqi and many other leading Grand Ayatollahs of that period and, thence, attained the degree of Ijtihad while passing through the heights and zenith of knowledge and character.

He learned from the legendary jurists and scholars of Islamic World of his period in Iran, Iraq, Syria and Palestine but he was very much eager to learn and practice spiritual aspects of Islam. Here, his fellow students included Grand Ayatollah Aqa Syed Abul Qasim Khoie, Grand Ayatollah Asadullah Madani, Grand Ayatollah Murtazha al-Khalkhali, Grand Ayatollah Syed Ali Naqai Naqvi (Molvi Naqqan), Allamah Tabataba'I, Ayatollah Syed Abdul Karim Rizvi Kashmiri, etc. Ayatollah Syed Ahmed Rizvi's spiritual education was provided by one of the brightest Spiritual figures of the twentieth century and teacher of Knowledge of Islamic spiritualism, Ali Tabatabaei, who is considered to be the illustrious and grandest personality of Shiite Gnosticism. He remained also under the guidance of Ayatollah Muhammad Hussein Kampani for some years.

Ali Tabatabaei had himself reached the pinnacle of spirituality and had traversed the highest stations of sair-o-salook (spiritualism). His students included Abul Qasim Khoei, Grand Ayatollah Syed Ruhullah Khoemini, Muhammad Husayn Tabatabaei, Mohammad-Taqi Bahjat Foumani, Abdul Karim Rizvi Kashmiri, Syed Hashim Hadad, Martyred Ayatollah Dastegaib. Imam Khomeini termed Syed Ali Qadhi as the best teacher of Metaphysics in Islam, as he express;-
"When it comes to cognition of (hidden meanings of) Tawheed, (Ayatollah) Qadhi emerges as a mountain"

The spiritual development of Ayatollah Syed Ahmed Rizvi Kashmiri reached the culmination under the supervision of his spiritual guide, Ali Tabatabaei. Aqa Ahmed Kashmiri is said to have attained the level and ability of moving soul outside his material body and returning in spiritual workout. He was a renowned religious and spiritual personality (Sahebi Karameh) and, in Kashmir, hundreds of spiritual and miraculous events had been reported about him. Ayatollah Syed Abdul Karim Kashmiri has described him as the strongest disciple of Ayatollah Qadhi while giving him title of Qadhi Saa’ni or Second Qadhi, seconding him to none other than the masterly Gnostic, Ayatollah Syed Qadhi Ali Tabatabai. At another place, Ayatollah Syed Abdul Karim Kashmiri has mentioned him as a great man and a strong (spiritual personality), who remained confined to his room and had idealistic manners., 

It has also been reported that Ali Tabatabaei had himself described Aqa Syed Ahmed Rizvi Kashmiri to be his strongest disciple.

Ayatollah Syed Ahmed Kashmiri returned to Kashmir, where he continued his mission of disseminating Islamic message for years and brought a new change in practical Islamic education of Kashmir. Aqa established a Seminary MADRASSA MOHAMMADIA in the Capital of Kashmir, Srinagar, where students learned under the best teachers of Kashmir, but his death was a blow to this educational center. He also used to give lectures on Juristic laws to gatherings of people on every Thursday night and Friday morning at his residence. All the sects of Kashmiri society had a great deal of attachment to Ahmed Rizvi. The then Prime Minister of Jammu and Kashmir, Sheikh Mohammad Abdullah, was very much influenced by Ayatollah Syed Ahmed Rizvi that he usually visited Aqa Rizvi's home for spiritual lessons and had desired to become one of his pupils and even after death of Ayatollah Syed Ahmed used to come to his burial. Ayatollah Aqa Ahmed traveled far flung areas to educate the masses and to spread the teachings of Islam.

Spiritual powers and miracles 

It is said once a person named Ghulam Hussein Makhmoor, who was a government official posted at Jammu almost three hundred kilometers away from Srinagar City, had posted a letter to Ayatollah Aqa Syed Ahmed, seeking instructions from him in a complicated matter. He was expecting reply to his letter would come from Ayatollah Ahmed Kashmiri in more than a week's time keeping in consideration the transportation and postal facilities of those days. But he was astounded when he found reply to his letter at his bed, on the same evening and that too in the room, the windows of which were closed and the door of which he had himself locked from outside earlier in the day while leaving for office.

It has been reported that when Ayatollah Aqa Ahmed Kashmiri was operated upon in a Hospital in Srinagar, the doctors who were performing the surgery were surprised over what they had seen. As per the doctors, all the vital organs of Aqa Syed Ahmad Kashmiri had been damaged but in spite of that he was alive. The condition of the organs was such that he should have had died several years earlier. Subsequently, groups of doctors would visit Ayatollah Aqa Syed Ahmad Kashmiri to pay their respect till he was alive.

Death 
Ayatollah Aqa Syed Ahmed Rizvi died on Thursday the 28th of Safar 1384 Hijri (9 July 1964) at his residence in Srinagar after concluding the congregational-gathering commemorating the departure of Muhammad and martyrdom of Shiite second Imam Hassan the son of Imam Ali.

References 

1901 births
1964 deaths
People from Srinagar
Shia scholars of Islam